Paul Bladt (1 June 1931 – 8 May 2022) was a French politician and trade unionist.

Biography
While working as an apprentice fitter, Bladt discovered the Young Christian Workers, which he joined at the age of 17. After leaving the organization in 1957, he began working as a fitter in Lorraine coal mines. He was an activist in the French Confederation of Christian Workers before working at the national office of the French Democratic Confederation of Labour for mineworkers.

In 1972, Bladt joined the Socialist Party (PS) and was elected mayor of Cocheren in 1977. He was consistently re-elected to this position until his resignation in 1997. In 1981, he was elected to represent Moselle's 6th constituency in the National Assembly, but did not seek re-election in 1986.

Paul Bladt died in Saint-Avold on 8 May 2022 at the age of 90.

References

1931 births
2022 deaths
Politicians from Metz
20th-century French politicians
21st-century French politicians
French trade unionists
French general councillors
Deputies of the 7th National Assembly of the French Fifth Republic
Mayors of places in Grand Est
Socialist Party (France) politicians